Sergei Vladimirovich Narubin (born 5 December 1981) is a former Russian footballer.

Club career
His career went through FC Saturn Ramenskoye (2000), FC Meteor Zhukovsky (2001), FC Fabus Bronnitsy (2002), FC Dynamo Bryansk (2003–2004), FC Alania Vladikavkaz (2005), FC Dynamo Bryansk (2006), FC Amkar Perm (2007–2014). He is 1.95m tall and weighs 87 kg. His playing position is goalkeeper.

On 21 May 2011 in a Russian Premier League game he was seriously injured in a collision with FC Rostov's Kornel Saláta. He had to undergo splenectomy (surgical removal of the spleen).

Career statistics

Notes

References

External links
 Statistics at ftbl.com (en)

1981 births
Footballers from Moscow
Living people
Russian footballers
FC Saturn Ramenskoye players
FC Spartak Vladikavkaz players
FC Amkar Perm players
FC Tosno players
FC Ufa players
Association football goalkeepers
Russian Premier League players
FC Dynamo Moscow players
FC Dynamo Bryansk players